Cousins, Alberta may refer to:

Cousins, Medicine Hat, a locality in Medicine Hat, Alberta
Cousins, Provost No. 52, Alberta, a locality in Provost No. 52, Alberta